Karl-Uno Olofsson (born 16 December 1940) is a retired Swedish middle-distance runner. He competed in 1500 m event at the 1964 Summer Olympics, but failed to reach the final. Olofsson became Nordic champion in the 1500 m (1965) and won the Swedish titles in the 800 m (1965), 1500 m (1963–65) and 4 × 1500 m relay (1965–67).

References

1940 births
Living people
Swedish male middle-distance runners
Olympic athletes of Sweden
Athletes (track and field) at the 1964 Summer Olympics